The Buffalo Bulls football statistical leaders are individual statistical leaders of the Buffalo Bulls football program in various categories, including passing, rushing, receiving, total offense, defensive stats, and kicking. Within those areas, the lists identify single-game, single-season, and career leaders. The Bulls represent the University at Buffalo, The State University of New York (UB) in the Mid-American Conference of NCAA Division I FBS.

Passing leaders: Buffalo's career leader in passing yardage is Joe Licata with 9,485 passing yards from 2012 to 2015. Drew Willy holds the career record for single-season passing yards with 3,304 in 2008. Joe Licata is Buffalo's career leader in passing touchdowns, with 76 touchdown passes. Licata also holds the records for single-season passing touchdowns, with 29 in 2014, and the record for single-game passing yards, with 497 yards against Toledo in 2013. Marty Barrett is Buffalo's all-time leader in single game passing touchdowns, with 6 touchdown passes in a 1983 game against Alfred.

Rushing leaders: Buffalo's career leader in rushing yards is Branden Oliver with 4,049 rushing yards from 2010 to 2013. All other significant school records for rushing are held by Jaret Patterson, who played for the Bulls from 2018 to 2020. Patterson ended his UB career with 52 touchdowns, setting single-season records of 1,799 yards and 19 touchdowns in 2019 and equaling his touchdowns record in 2020. In the Bulls' 2020 game against Kent State, Patterson set new single-game school records with 409 yards and an FBS record-tying 8 touchdowns.

Receiving leaders: Naaman Roosevelt holds Buffalo's receiving records for most career receiving yards (3,551) and receptions (268). During Roosevelt's time with the Bulls from 2006 to 2009, he also set the single-season records for receptions (104), receiving yards (1,402), and receiving touchdowns (13), all set in the 2008 season. Buffalo's career leader in receiving touchdowns is Alex Neutz, who caught 31 touchdown passes while playing for the Bulls from 2010 to 2013. Chaz Ahmed and James Starks share Buffalo's single-game record for receptions with 13, with Ahmed setting the record in 1990 against Mercyhurst, and Starks matching it in 2008 against Akron. Buffalo's record for single-game receiving touchdowns is 4, and is shared between Chris D'Amico and Alex Neutz, with D'Amico setting the mark in 1983 against Alfred, and Neutz matching it in 2012 against Morgan State. Joe D'Amico holds Buffalo's record for single-game receiving yards, with 218 in a 1981 game against Cortland.

Defensive leaders: Buffalo's career leader in tackles is Davonte Shannon with 461 tackles from 2007 to 2010. Khalil Mack holds Buffalo's all-time lead in sacks, with 28.5 sacks from 2010 to 2013. Steve Nappo is the Bulls career leader in interceptions, with 19 from 1984 to 1986. Nappo also holds Buffalo's single-season record for interceptions, with 13 in 1986. Craig Guest is Buffalo's single-season leader in tackles, with 161 in 1995, and Vince Canosa holds the Bulls single-season record for sacks with 12.5 in 1993.

Historical caveats. Although Buffalo began competing in intercollegiate football in 1894, the school's official record book considers the "modern era" to have begun in 1949. Records from before this year are often incomplete and inconsistent, and they are generally not included in these lists.

These lists are dominated by more recent players for several reasons:
 Since 1949, seasons have increased from 10 games to 11 and then 12 games in length.
 Buffalo did not field a varsity football team during 1904–1914, 1943–1945, or 1971–1976. 
 The NCAA didn't allow freshmen to play varsity football until 1972 (with the exception of the World War II years), allowing players to have four-year careers.
 Bowl games only began counting toward single-season and career statistics in 2002. The Bulls have played in five bowl games since then, the 2009 International Bowl, 2013 Famous Idaho Potato Bowl, 2018 Dollar General Bowl, 2019 Bahamas Bowl, and 2020 Camellia Bowl, allowing players to accumulate statistics for an additional game in those seasons.
 In two of their bowl seasons, 2008 and 2018, the Bulls also played in the MAC Championship Game, giving players in those seasons yet another game in which to accumulate statistics. They played in that game a third time in 2020, but only played 5 regular-season games due to COVID-19.
 Due to COVID-19 issues, the NCAA ruled that the 2020 season would not count against the athletic eligibility of any football player, giving everyone who played in that season the opportunity for five years of eligibility instead of the normal four.

These lists are updated through the end of the 2021 season.

Passing

Passing yards

Passing touchdowns

Rushing

Rushing yards

Rushing touchdowns

Receiving

Receptions

Receiving yards

Receiving touchdowns

Total offense
Total offense is the sum of passing and rushing statistics. It does not include receiving or returns.

Total offense yards

Touchdowns responsible for
"Touchdowns responsible for" is the NCAA's official term for combined passing and rushing touchdowns.

Defense

Interceptions

Tackles

Sacks

Kicking

Field goals made

Field goal percentage

References

Lists of college football statistical leaders by team
Statistical Leaders